David Smith (born November 21, 1968) is a Canadian ice hockey coach and former player. He is currently the head coach of the NCAA RPI Engineers men's ice hockey team, a position he has held since the 2017–18 season.

Smith was a member of the 1992–93 Turner Cup champions, the Fort Wayne Komets.

Coaching career
In 1998, following a six-year professional minor league career, Smith joined the coaching staff of the Miami RedHawks men's ice hockey team as an assistant. He also served as an assistant coach with Bowling Green State University, and Mercyhurst University, before being hired on April 15, 2005 as the head coach at Canisius College.

Head coaching record

References

External links

1968 births
Living people
Binghamton Rangers players
Bowling Green Falcons ice hockey coaches
Canadian ice hockey coaches
Canadian ice hockey centres
Canisius Golden Griffins men's ice hockey coaches
Dayton Bombers players
Detroit Vipers players
Fort Wayne Komets players
Los Angeles Ice Dogs players
Mercyhurst Lakers men's ice hockey coaches
Miami RedHawks men's ice hockey coaches
Ohio State Buckeyes men's ice hockey players
Orlando Solar Bears (IHL) players
RPI Engineers men's ice hockey coaches
San Antonio Dragons players
People from Wellington County, Ontario
Ice hockey people from Ontario